U of R may refer to:

in Canada
 University of Regina

in the United States
 University of Redlands
 University of Richmond
 University of Rochester

in the United Kingdom
 University of Reading

See also
 UR (disambiguation)